Largo Woodruff (born July 18, 1955) is an American actress who appeared in numerous films in the 1980s. She began her career appearing in commercials before landing a bit part in Woody Allen's Stardust Memories (1980). Her first major featured role was in Tobe Hooper's slasher film The Funhouse (1981). She also appeared in the controversial television film The Choice (1981), as well as the biopic Bill (1981) and its 1983 sequel.

Life and career

Early life
Largo Woodruff was born July 18, 1955 in New Jersey to Wallace and Maxine Woodruff, the second of three children. She has one elder sister, Allegro, a writer, and a younger brother, Lento, a carpenter and offshore oil rigger. Woodruff's father was a professional orchestra musician, and her parents named her and her brothers after musical tempos, with her name, Largo, meaning a wide or broadly slow tempo.

Woodruff was raised in the Panama Canal Zone from age 2. As a child, she studied various dance as well as cello and guitar. At age 18, she relocated to New York City with the hopes of becoming an actress, and enrolled at the American Academy of Dramatic Arts.

Career
After relocating to New York, Woodruff was hired as a dancer in an off-Broadway theatrical production, and also began acting in commercials, appearing in television advertisements for A&W Root Beer, Kraft Foods, and Ruffles. She had minor bit parts in Fingers (1978) and Woody Allen's Stardust Memories (1980). Also in 1980, she appeared in an ABC Afterschool Special entitled "Stoned." Her first major feature film role was as Liz Duncan in Tobe Hooper's slasher film The Funhouse (1981), filmed in Miami. She also appeared in the controversial television drama film The Choice (1981) opposite Susan Clark and Mitchell Ryan, which followed a young woman who undergoes an abortion. The same year, she had a leading role in the television film Bill, a biopic about Bill Sackter starring Mickey Rooney and Dennis Quaid. She reprised her role for the film's sequel, Bill: On His Own (1983).

In 1986, Woodruff appeared in a supporting role in the rape and revenge film The Ladies Club, and in 1990 had a role in Perry Mason: The Case of the Poisoned Pen. She subsequently appeared in the television film Bare Essentials (1991) and Taking the Heat (1993). Woodruff had a minor role in the 1999 drama film My Last Love, and subsequently appeared in a bit part in the horror film Jeepers Creepers 2 (2003).

Filmography

Film

References

External links

1955 births
Actresses from Florida
Actresses from New Jersey
American film actresses
American stage actresses
Living people
21st-century American women